Inezgane-Aït Melloul (Berber: Inezgan Ayt Mellul) is a prefecture of Morocco. Its capital is Inezgane.

Subdivisions
The prefecture is divided administratively into the following:

References